The Miracle Rider is a 1935 American Western film serial directed by B. Reeves Eason and Armand Schaefer for  Mascot. It stars silent movie cowboy star Tom Mix in his last major film role.

Plot summary
Zaroff (Charles Middleton), a rancher and oil company owner, wants to drive the Ravenhead Indians off their reservation so that he can mine the rare element X-94, a super explosive, found there and sell it to the highest bidder. Texas Ranger Tom Morgan tries to stop him and save the tribe.

Cast
Tom Mix as Tom Morgan, Texas Ranger
Joan Gale as Ruth 
Charles Middleton as Zaroff, a rancher and oil company owner
Robert Frazer as Chief Black Wing
Niles Welch as Metzger 
Jason Robards Sr. as Carlton  
Bob Kortman as Longboat 
Edward Earle as Christopher Adams, Indian Agent 
Edward Hearn as Emil Janss 
Tom London as Sewell, one of Zaroff's henchmen
Edmund Cobb as Vining, one of Zaroff's henchmen
Ernie Adams as John Stelter
Max Wagner as Morley, one of Zaroff's henchmen
Charles King as Hatton, one of Zaroff's henchmen
Stanley Price as Chapman, one of Zaroff's henchmen
George Chesebro as Crossman, Janss Hand
Tex Cooper as Buffalo Bill (uncredited)
Bud Geary as Davy Crockett (uncredited)
Pat O'Malley as Capt. Sam Morgan (uncredited) 
Jay Wilsey as Daniel Boone/Henchmen (uncredited)

Production

This was Tom Mix's last film and his only sound serial.  Tom Mix was still an A-list star in 1935, alongside Charles Chaplin, Douglas Fairbanks, Sr. and Mary Pickford.  He was paid $40,000 for four weeks work on The Miracle Rider, which he used as urgent funding to support his circus.

The serial combined the large cast and interlocking plots of a silent serial with the science fiction and cliffhangers of the sound era. Filming of the outdoor action sequences took place primarily at the Iverson Movie Ranch in Chatsworth, Calif., on the outskirts of Los Angeles. The movie ranch, which had been in use as a filming location since the early silent movie era, was known for its rugged landscape and giant sandstone boulders. One of those boulders became known as Tom Mix Rock in later years, after it was discovered that bootholes had been carved in the rock to help the actor shoot a scene atop the rock for The Miracle Rider.

Stunts
Tom Mix, whose voice was strained and nasal due to a repeatedly broken nose and a bullet through his throat, did a lot of his own stunts, although some were doubled by Cliff Lyons.

Chapter titles
 The Vanishing Indian
 The Firebird Strikes
 The Flying Knife
 A Race with Death
 Double Barreled Doom
 Thundering Hoofs [sic]
 The Dragnet
 Guerilla Warfare
 The Silver Road
 Signal Fires
 A Traitor Dies
 Danger Rides with Death
 The Secret of X-94
 Between Two Fires
 Justice Rides the Plains
Source:

This was Mascot's only 15-chapter serial.

"Zaroff" is obviously inspired by Basil Zaharoff, a notorious early twentieth-century arms merchant, often cited as one of the so-called "merchants of death", who supposedly helped bring on World War I.

See also
 List of film serials
 List of film serials by studio

References

External links

Tom Mix Rock and filming of The Miracle Rider at the Iverson Movie Ranch
 Iverson Movie Ranch: History, vintage photos.
The Miracle Rider Original Trailer (1935), Texas Archive of the Moving Image

1935 films
1930s English-language films
American black-and-white films
Mascot Pictures film serials
Films about the Texas Ranger Division
Films directed by B. Reeves Eason
Films directed by Armand Schaefer
1935 Western (genre) films
American Western (genre) films
1930s American films